{{Infobox writer 
| image = Tommy Blacha.jpg
| name        = Tommy Blacha
| caption     = Blacha at the 2008 San Diego Comic-Con
| pseudonym   = Tom Blacha
| birth_name  = Thomas Blacha
| birth_date  = 
| birth_place = Detroit, Michigan, U.S.
| death_date  =
| death_place =
| occupation  = Voice actorWriterProducer
| nationality = American
| period      =
| genre       = ComedySatirePro Wrestling
| subject     =
| movement    =
| notableworks = Late Night with Conan O'BrienTV FunhouseDa Ali G ShowMetalocalypse Mongo Wrestling Alliance
| influences  =
| influenced  =
| website =
}}
Thomas Blacha (born August 25, 1962) is an American voice actor, writer, and producer. He is known working for shows such as Metalocalypse, Da Ali G Show and Late Night with Conan O'Brien.

Career
Blacha started as a local Chicago Comedy writer, where he met Andy Richter. Richter eventually landed Blacha a job with the Conan O'Brien show in 1993. Tommy worked on the Conan O'Brien show until 1999 writing bit pieces and developing such characters as "Gaseous Wiener" and "PimpBot5000".

After leaving the Conan O'Brien show, Blacha went on to work for WWE in 1999 as a Creative Director. At WWE he helped come up with new plotlines and stories for the company. This role put him in bit parts for the fights themselves, where, while playing a medic, he once ended up getting slammed into a table by the wrestler Kane. Tommy also participated in what was voted Monday Night Raw's worst moment, which was the delivery of Mae Young's hand baby.

During this time, Tommy was also doing work with TV Funhouse, the Comedy Central series based on the animated shorts on Saturday Night Live. He was part of the writing team as well as playing the voice part of Hank and Whiskers. Some sources also list Tommy Blacha as a Producer for TV FunHouse. While there he wrote and produced the infamous "Black Sabbath" cartoon and the Oprah skewering "Stedman: Secret Agent" cartoon with Andy Breckman.

Tommy lived in Las Vegas for a short while in 2002 and 2003 where he was promoting mixed martial arts and pro wrestling events. He was also attempting to do this in Japan and Russia.

By 2004 Tommy Blacha moved onto new projects, becoming a writer on Andy Richter Controls the Universe, Da Ali G Show and head writer for Late World with Zach and The Orlando Jones Show. During this time, he met Brendon Small and began developing the concept for Metalocalypse which was picked up by Adult Swim in 2005 and was first aired in August 2006. In the show he voices the characters of Toki Wartooth, William Murderface, Dr. Rockso and many others. He co-wrote, alongside Brendan Small, every episode of the first and second seasons of the show, and directed the episodes "Dethstars" and "Dethgov".  For the third and fourth seasons, he left the production of the show but still returned to voice his characters.

Since mid-2015, Tommy has been a recurring guest/co-host on Ten Minute Podcast. In June 2021, it was announced that Blacha will serve as showrunner for the upcoming Netflix original animated series Super Giant Robot Brothers'' due for release in 2022.

Filmography

References

External links
 
 Video interview with Tommy Blacha

1962 births
American male comedians
21st-century American comedians
American comedy musicians
American comedy writers
American satirists
American male television actors
American television directors
American television producers
American television writers
American male television writers
American male voice actors
Living people
Showrunners
21st-century American screenwriters
21st-century American male writers
Dethklok members